Platystigma may refer to:
 Platystigma (dragonfly), a genus of dragonflies in the family Coenagrionidae
 Platystigma (plant), a genus of plants in the family Papaveraceae
 Platystigma, a genus of plants in the family Metteniusaceae, synonym of Platea